The 2006–07 Marist Red Foxes men's basketball team represented Marist College during the 2006–07 NCAA Division I men's basketball season. The Red Foxes, led by third year head coach Matt Brady, played their home games at the McCann Center and were members of the Metro Atlantic Athletic Conference. The team captains were seniors Jared Jordan and Will Whittington. They finished the season 25–9 overall, 14–4 in MAAC play to finish in first place, winning the MAAC regular season championship. They advanced to the semifinals of the MAAC tournament where they lost to Siena. As a regular season conference champion who failed to win their conference tournament, they received an automatic bid to the 2007 National Invitation Tournament where they defeated Oklahoma State in the first round before falling to NC State in the second round. The season was also highlighted by wins over Big Ten Conference opponent Minnesota and Old Dominion, who had defeated eighth-ranked Georgetown two games prior.

Preview 
Marist entered the season having finished in third place in the MAAC the previous season. The team returned first team All-MAAC selection Jordan, and third team All-MAAC selection Whittington. Jordan led the NCAA in total assists with 247, and assists per game with 8.5, while Whittington was a prolific 3-point shooter. James Smith, a versatile 7' center, also returned for Marist. With the returning talent, Marist was the unanimous choice to win the conference title. Jordan was selected as the preseason MAAC player of the year, while Whittington was tabbed as a preseason All-MAAC first team selection.

Roster

Schedule
The team had a fast start to the season, getting off to a 14–4 mark, and 6–1 in conference play. They would lose three of their next four games, but finished the season on an eight-game winning streak. This enabled Marist to qualify for just their fourth post season appearance (2 NCAA and 1 NIT).

Marist's first highlight of the season was a win over Big Ten member Minnesota in the inaugural Old Spice Classic on November 23. Despite playing SEC foe Arkansas close in the semifinals, the Razorbacks proved too tough down the stretch. Marist concluded the Old Spice Classic by defeating Western Michigan in the third place game. Jordan was named to the All-Tournament Team and selected as the MVP of the tournament. The team continued their highlights, defeating Old Dominion at home on November 29, 84–71. Old Dominion had defeated No. 8 ranked Georgetown just 10 days prior to this matchup. The final score was exactly the same as the previous season, although the Monarchs won that contest. Both teams ended the night with identical 5–2 records as well.

On February 24, Marist played their final MAAC game at home against their rival, the Siena Saints. Entering the contest, Marist was 13–4 in MAAC play, while Siena was 12–5. Niagara, who would play against Rider on Sunday afternoon, was also 12–5. There was a potential for a three-way tie for first place should Marist lose the game. The team would need a win to capture the outright MAAC regular season championship for the first time in school history. In a nationally televised game on ESPN2, and in front of a sellout crowd of 3,200, Marist defeated Siena 98–88 in overtime. Both games that the two teams played during the season had been overtime wins for Marist. They ended the regular season slate 23–7 overall, and 14–4 in the MAAC, and clinched the No. 1 seed in the MAAC tournament, while also setting the school mark for victories in a season (23).

As the No. 1 seed in the MAAC tournament in Bridgeport, Connecticut, they defeated No. 8 seed Canisius 87–63 in the quarterfinals. In the semifinals, they were matched up again with Siena, for the third time in the season. This time, Siena defeated Marist 86–78, and Siena moved on to the championship game. Because they finished the season as the No. 1 seed, and failed to win their conference tournament, they were an automatic selection to the NIT. In the first round, they were matched up to play at Oklahoma State in Stillwater, Oklahoma. Senior guard Will Whittington led Marist with 31 points, as Marist scored the upset, 67–64. It was the first postseason win in school history. Despite Whittington leading the Red Foxes with 18 points, Marist lost to NC State in the second round, 62–69 to end the season.

|-
!colspan=9 style=| Regular season

|-
!colspan=9 style=|MAAC tournament

|-
!colspan=9 style=| 2007 NIT

|-

Player statistics

Awards & milestones

MAAC Conference honors 
The following players/coaches earned Metro Atlantic Athletic Conference postseason recognition:

MAAC Player of the Year
Jared Jordan, Marist (Sr., G, Hartford, Connecticut)

First team All-MAAC
Jared Jordan, Marist

Second team All-MAAC
Will Whittington, Marist (Sr., G, Kingwood, Texas)

MAAC Coach of the Year
Matt Brady

Other awards and honors 
Jared Jordan – All-New York Metropolitan NCAA Division I men's college basketball player of the year. (Haggerty Award)
On June 28, 2007, Jordan was selected 45th in the 2007 NBA Draft by the Los Angeles Clippers.

Season records 
Marist set an all-time single season school record with 25 wins. Ironically, the women's team also set a school record for wins during the same season, winning 29 games.
Jordan led the nation in total assists and assists per game for the second consecutive year, 286 total and 8.7 per game.
Will Whittington led the nation in 3-point field goals made and attempted, going 137–345.

Rankings

See also
2006–07 Marist Red Foxes women's basketball team

Notes

References

Marist
Marist Red Foxes men's basketball seasons
Marist
Marist Red Foxes men's basketball
Marist Red Foxes men's basketball